Daniel Curtis Lee (born May 17, 1991) is an American actor, comedian and rapper, best known for portraying Simon "Cookie" Nelson-Cook on the Nickelodeon series Ned's Declassified School Survival Guide from 2004 to 2007.

Overview

Early life 
Lee was born in Jackson, Mississippi to Nathaniel Lee Sr., a producer, and Sharial Lee. His older brother, Nathaniel Lee Jr., is also an actor. He lived in Mississippi until the age of 10, when he relocated to Long Beach, California.

Career 
His breakthrough role came in 2004 when he started playing Simon "Cookie" Nelson-Cook on the Nickelodeon series Ned's Declassified School Survival Guide. 

In the original 2003 pilot, “Cookie” was called “Boogie” and was played by actor Stephen Markarian, before Lee was cast a year later.

After Ned’s Declassified School Survival Guide was cancelled in 2007, Lee would go on to play Kornelius "Kojo" Jonesworth on the Disney XD sitcom Zeke and Luther. He has also appeared in other television shows, such as First Monday and The Shield, and films such as Friday After Next.

Curtis is also a rapper and releases his own solo works to Spotify. His debut album, Double Lit Double It, was released in 2020.

Personal life 
Lee is a former member of the Hollywood Knights, a celebrity basketball team. Daniel graduated with a degree in linguistics from California State University Long Beach.

Filmography

Television and film

Songs and music videos
 2004 - "Ned's Declassified School Survival Guide Theme Song"
 2009 - "Zeke and Luther Theme Song"
 2009 - "U Can't Touch This" - Kojo / Himself
 2010 - "In the Summertime" - Kojo / Himself (with Zeke and Luther co-star Adam Hicks)
 2020 - “Double Lit Double It” (debut studio album)

References

External links
 
 Daniel Curtis Lee at Myspace

1991 births
Male actors from Mississippi
African-American male actors
21st-century American male actors
American male child actors
American male television actors
Living people
Actors from Jackson, Mississippi
21st-century African-American people